Magneuptychia alcinoe, the Alcinoe satyr, is a species of butterfly of the family Nymphalidae. It is found from Costa Rica to Colombia, Ecuador, Bolivia and Venezuela.

The wingspan is about 38 mm.

The larvae feed on grasses.

References

Butterflies described in 1867
Euptychiina
Nymphalidae of South America
Taxa named by Baron Cajetan von Felder
Taxa named by Rudolf Felder